
Year 236 BC was a year of the pre-Julian Roman calendar. At the time it was known as the Year of the Consulship of Caudinus and Varus (or, less frequently, year 518 Ab urbe condita). The denomination 236 BC for this year has been used since the early medieval period, when the Anno Domini calendar era became the prevalent method in Europe for naming years.

Events 
 By place 
 Asia Minor 
 Antiochus Hierax, supported by his mother Laodice I, allies himself with the Galatians (Celts) and two other states that are traditional foes of the Seleucid kingdom. With the aid of these forces, he inflicts a crushing defeat on his older brother Seleucus II's army at Ancyra in Anatolia. Seleucus leaves the country beyond the Taurus Mountains to his brother and the other powers of the peninsula.

 Egypt 
 Eratosthenes is appointed by King Ptolemy III Euergetes as head and third librarian of the Alexandrian library.

 China 
 King Ying Zheng of the State of Qin begins a series of campaigns against the State of Zhao that will end with Zhao's conquest in 228 BC. The Qin generals Huan Yi and Wang Jian seize nine cities in the Yecheng region.

 Sri Lanka 
 Buddhism is introduced to Sri Lanka by Mahinda, a monk acting on behalf of the late Ashoka.

Births 
 Scipio Africanus, Roman general in the Second Punic War and statesman of the Roman Republic (approximate date) (d. 183 BC)

Deaths

References